Brittany Wiser (born August 2, 1987) is an American beauty pageant title holder from Bozeman, Montana. As of 2015, she is one of only two women to earn both the Miss Montana and Miss Montana USA titles.

Early life and education
Wiser was born in Bozeman, Montana, on August 2, 1987, to Betty and Lee Wiser.  She is a summa cum laude, Phi Beta Kappa, 2009 graduate of the University of Denver with a degree in communications management and minors in chemistry & leadership. After graduation, she enrolled in the pre-medical post-baccalaureate program at Montana State University.

Pageant career
On June 18, 2009, Brittany Wiser entered her first-ever beauty pageant. On June 20, she was crowned Miss Montana 2009. Unlike most state pageants in the Miss America system, Montana does not use preliminary local pageants to limit entrants to the state-level competition. In January 2010, she competed in the Miss America 2010 pageant in Las Vegas, Nevada. Wiser was a Top-10 finalist for the Quality of Life Award. Her platform was suicide prevention and her talent was singing.

In September 2010, Wiser won the title of Miss Montana USA 2011. She competed in the Miss USA 2011 pageant at the Theatre for the Performing Arts in the Planet Hollywood Resort and Casino on the Las Vegas Strip in January 2011.

References

External links

1988 births
Living people
Miss America 2010 delegates
Miss USA 2011 delegates
People from Bozeman, Montana
University of Denver alumni